Michael Joseph Ryan (23 June 1882 – 29 September 1957) was an Australian rules footballer who played with Collingwood in the Victorian Football League (VFL).

Notes

External links 

Mick Ryan's profile at Collingwood Forever

1882 births
1957 deaths
Australian rules footballers from Victoria (Australia)
Collingwood Football Club players
Seymour Football Club players